This article lists the winners and nominees for the NAACP Image Award for Outstanding Supporting Actress in a Comedy Series. The award was first given during the 1996 ceremony and since its conception, Marsai Martin holds the record for the most wins with five.

Winners and nominees
Winners are listed first and highlighted in bold.

1990s

2000s

2010s

2020s

Multiple wins and nominations

Wins

 5 wins
 Marsai Martin
 3 wins
 Keshia Knight Pulliam
 Terri J. Vaughn

 Vanessa Williams
 Camille Winbush
 2 wins
 Tichina Arnold
 Jackée Harry

Nominations

 8 nominations
 Marsai Martin

 5 nominations
 Sheryl Lee Ralph

 5 nominations
 Tichina Arnold
 Wendy Raquel Robinson
 Wanda Sykes
 Vanessa Williams

 4 nominations
 Anna Deavere Smith
 Telma Hopkins
 Yvonne Orji
 Keshia Knight Pulliam
 Terri J. Vaughn
 Sofía Vergara
 Camille Winbush

 3 nominations
 Laverne Cox
 Dee Dee Davis
 Jenifer Lewis
 Valarie Pettiford
 Natasha Rothwell
 Countess Vaughn
 2 nominations
 Uzo Aduba
 Tisha Campbell-Martin
 Kim Coles
 Whoopi Goldberg
 Regina Hall
 Jackée Harry
 Rashida Jones
 T'Keyah Crystal Keymah
 Nia Long
 Amber Riley
 Gabourey Sidibe

References

NAACP Image Awards
Television awards for Best Supporting Actress